Eugene "Gene" Desmond (born 1956) is an Irish former Gaelic footballer. His league and championship career at senior level with the Cork county team lasted for the 1977-78 season.

Born in Cork, Desmond first played for the St Finbarr's club at juvenile and underage levels before joining the senior team. In a club career that lasted over a decade, he won two All-Ireland medals, three Munster medals and four county senior championship medals.

Desmond made his debut on the inter-county scene at the age of sixteen when he was selected for the Cork minor team. He enjoyed two championship seasons with the minor team, culminating with the winning of an All-Ireland medal as captain in 1974. Desmond subsequently joined the Cork under-21; however, his three seasons on that team ended without success. By this stage he had joined the Cork senior team and made his debut during the 1978 championship.

Honours
St Finbarr's
 All-Ireland Senior Club Football Championship (2): 1980, 1981
 Munster Senior Club Football Championship (3): 1979, 1980, 1982
 Cork Senior Football Championship (4): 1979, 1980, 1982, 1985

Cork
 All-Ireland Minor Football Championship (1): 1974
 Munster Minor Football Championship (2): 1973, 1974

References

1956 births
Living people
Cork inter-county Gaelic footballers
St Finbarr's Gaelic footballers